Janice Morley-Lecomte is a Canadian provincial politician, who was elected as the Member of the Legislative Assembly of Manitoba for the riding of Seine River in the 2016 election. She is a member of the Progressive Conservative party, and defeated NDP challenger Lise Pinkos in the election. She was re-elected in the 2019 provincial election.

References 

Living people
Politicians from Winnipeg
Women MLAs in Manitoba
Progressive Conservative Party of Manitoba MLAs
21st-century Canadian women politicians
21st-century Canadian politicians
Year of birth missing (living people)